Martin River Glacier is a 25-mile-long (40 km) glacier in the U.S. state of Alaska in Yakutat-Copper River region. It flows southwest to its terminus at the head of the Martin River, 20 miles (32 km) northeast of Katalla, in the Chugach Mountains.

See also
 List of glaciers

References

Glaciers of Alaska
Glaciers of Chugach Census Area, Alaska
Glaciers of Unorganized Borough, Alaska